Ripon Grammar School is a co-educational, boarding and day, selective grammar school in Ripon, North Yorkshire, England. It has been named top-performing state school in the north for nine years running by The Sunday Times. It is one of the best-performing schools in the North of England; in 2011, 91% of pupils gained the equivalent of 5 or more GCSEs at grade C or above, including English and maths; the figure has been over 84% consistently since at least 2006.  The school was graded "outstanding" in its 2012 Ofsted report. In 2017, the school's boarding was rated 'outstanding' by Ofsted. As a state school, it does not charge fees for pupils to attend, but they must pass an entrance test at 11+ or 13+. There is no selection test for entry into sixth form as pupils are admitted on the basis of their GCSE grades.

Admission
It is a selective school, one of the very few in the North of England (Penrith, Cumbria has the most northern grammar schools).

History
The school is believed to have been founded in Saxon times, but the first documentary proof of a school in the town is dated 1348 when Ricardum le Chamberlayn, who is described as 'the former master of the Schoolhouse' was one of 138 people who failed to appear before the Court of the King's Bench. It is suggested that he was involved in a mass disturbance, perhaps a riot. The medieval school, which was connected to a collegiate church in Ripon, was given land by benefactors but, in order to protect the school from the seizing of land by Henry VIII, priests told the king's commissioners the land had nothing to do with the church and the school was saved. However, in 1550, when the authorities discovered the chicanery that had occurred, the Duchy of Lancaster seized the lands and the future of the school was in doubt. Queen Mary, the only child of Henry VIII and his first wife, Catherine of Aragon, looked kindly on the school and signed a royal charter which established the Free Grammar School of Queen Mary at Ripon, granted the school's ten governors the disputed land. The re-founding in 1555 during the reign of Queen Mary is regarded as the foundation of the modern Ripon Grammar School. Originally a boys' school, the school merged with Ripon Girls' High School to become coeducational in 1962. Although most pupils are day pupils from the surrounding area and Ripon itself, there are boys' and girls' boarding houses, School House and Johnson House, which accommodate 100 pupils.

Motto
The school motto is the Old English phrase Giorne ymb lare ymb diowatdomas ("Eager to learn and seek after righteousness").

Traditions
In December, RGS holds its annual Festival of Nine Lessons and Carols in Ripon Cathedral, where student choirs and orchestras perform.
In July, students, staff, governors and local dignitaries gather for the annual Commemoration Service at Ripon Cathedral to commemorate the school's founders and give thanks at the end of the school year.

The son of the first Marquis of Ripon, Earl de Grey, founded the exhibitions to universities, which are still presented to the school in the form of major and minor De Grey Awards at Speech Day every year.

There is an Old Riponians' Association Winter Reunion every year, when past pupils return to the school to challenge current students in a series of sports fixtures including rugby, hockey, football and netball.

Sixth form students organise a series of Charity Week events every year, including concerts, pantomimes, quizzes and dance competitions, raising around £15,000 for chosen charities annually. Recent charities which have benefited include St Michael's Hospice in Harrogate, Surfers Against Sewage and the Yorkshire Air Ambulance.

Sport
The school offers a wide range of sporting activities including swimming, tennis, rugby, cricket, climbing, netball, hockey and football. The U18 rugby team have won the Yorkshire championships three times running, most recently in 2020. The U-13 cricket team won the Yorkshire Cup in 2019. The U-18s girls' hockey team were State Boarding National Champions in 2019. The U-18s girls' netball team were awarded the National State Boarding Schools Championship trophy in 2019. RGS swimmers have made it to the national finals of the English Secondary Schools championships both in 2019 and 2020. A number of riders from the school's Equestrian Society have reached the national finals of the NSEA equestrian championships at Hickstead Arena.

British Lions player Sir Ian McGeechan officially opened the school's new £1m world-class all-weather 3G pitch in February 2020, an event also attended by past pupil Peter Squires, British Lion & England Rugby Union International/Yorkshire County Cricketer.

Olympic diver and gold medalist Jack Laugher attended RGS from Year 7 to the end of his sixth form in 2014. Team GB and World Championships cyclist Abi Smith joined sixth form in 2018 as a boarding student.

In 2012, pupil and Olympic diver Jack Laugher, then aged 17, backed the campaign to save the school's swimming pool from council cuts.

Boarding
It is the only state-maintained boarding school in Yorkshire. After the Duchy of Lancaster seized its land in 1550, Queen Mary intervened to save the school, signing a royal charter in 1555 establishing the Free Grammar School of Queen Mary in Ripon. The founding charter stated the school was to be free of charge to local pupils. Due to the size and scale of rural North Yorkshire, and to overcome the lack of money, boarding was introduced for children in outlying villages and farms, but the school soon came to rely on the income and in the 1880s was plunged into financial uncertainty when wealthy families removed their boys from the school because of a rumour involving the headmaster and a local woman.
There are two boarding houses, School House for boys and Johnson House for girls as well as the new School House annexe for girls, which house 100 students. Whereas opting to board may once have been a way to secure a place, that is no longer the case. Parents now commit for five years from Y7 and two years from Y12.

Academic
The school is consistently among the top performing schools both regionally and nationally. In 2019 Schools minister Nick Gibb wrote to the headmaster to congratulate the school for being in the top two per cent of state-funded mainstream schools for progress to GCSEs. He congratulated staff and students on their latest results and said: "Thank you for your work in continuing the drive towards higher academic standards."

In 2019, more than 76% of all A-level grades achieved were at A*-B, with 14 students achieving a clean sweep of A*s. Nearly half of all grades awarded were at A*-A. At GCSE in the same year, 92% of grades were 9–5 and 62% 9-7s.

In 2018 and 2017, 76% and 79.1% of A-level grades were at A*-B and 64% of GCSE grades were 9-7/A*-A.

The school was listed in the top 5% of schools nationally for the progress students make in sixth form, based on outcomes over three years to 2019.

In 2018, the school's exam results placed it among the top 15 schools in the country.

In 2019 and 2020, the leading school comparison website School Guide awarded the school a five-star certificate for excellence, placing it among the top 20% of 34,000 state and independent schools in England.

Sixth form
Ripon Grammar School has been placed in the top 5% of schools nationally for the progress students make in sixth form. The majority of students from lower years progress to the sixth form but the school also admits around 50 students every year from other local schools and further afield, with admission based on GCSE results. While academic outcomes are outstanding, the school encourages sixth formers to take on leadership roles and develop wider skills through enrichment activities encompassing everything from charity work and volunteering to sport, music, drama and business enterprise. There are also a wide range of student-led sixth form societies. Alongside A-levels, students can undertake an extended project qualification (EPQ).

Houses
Every student is a member of one of four houses. In 1906, Porteus and Hutton houses – each named after a famous ex-pupil – and De Grey – named after a family of benefactors – were founded. School House, for boarders, was added in 1928. 
Every year, students take part in a series of points-based inter-house competitions, which include sport, debating and singing, traditionally a source of pride for pupils of respective houses. 
Hutton House is named after former Archbishop of Canterbury Matthew Hutton, who joined Ripon Grammar School in 1701.
Porteus House is named after writer, preacher and Bishop of London Beilby Porteus, a keen supporter of the movement to abolish slavery, who joined Ripon Grammar School in 1744.
De Grey House is named after Earl de Grey, the son of the first marquis of Ripon, and a generous benefactor of the school.
School House was added in 1928 for boarding students but the membership has broadened to accommodate day pupils as well as boarders.

Clubs and societies
RGS is home to a wide range of clubs and societies, including a Computer Coding Club, Equestrian Society, Wordsmiths Writing Club, Eco-committee, Debating Society, Quiz Club, Science and Engineering Club, Biology Club, Feminism Society, Astronomy Club, Medicine Club and Politics Society. Most clubs are student-led, although some, such as computer coding, are led by experts in their field.

Music and drama
The school has a purpose-built music block which includes a bespoke recording studio and Apple Mac computer suite. The school's wide range of ensembles include the chamber orchestra, chamber choir and big band. Recent musical productions include Anything Goes, Les Misérables, Billy Elliott and Little Shop of Horrors.

In 2018, 100 singers from the school's five choirs recorded a Christmas album in Ripon Cathedral, where they regularly perform.

In 2022, string players in the Chamber Orchestra played the backing track for local band The Dunwells latest album.

The annual school production is the highlight of the year. Productions in recent years include Murder on the Nile and An Inspector Calls. 
The junior drama club meets weekly for workshop activities and improvisations and puts on a major production in the summer term. Productions have included Peter Pan, The Jungle Book and Scrooge.

There is a House drama competition every year, with each House putting on a short play, directed and produced by senior students, with students of all ages taking part.

Parents' ballot
Ripon was the first and only school catchment area in England in which parents voted to keep a selective school in March 2000 by 1,493 to 747. Even the head of the neighbouring secondary modern school, Ripon College, Paul Lowery was in favour of keeping the selection system as it was, which contributed to the proposal's defeat. The campaign against the school was co-ordinated by Debbie Atkins, who like other local parents chose to send her children to school in Harrogate.

To force a ballot, petitions had to be successfully raised. These were allowed from December 1998, and Ripon was the only one out of 39 resulting in a ballot. The cost of administration of these petitions and the one ballot was £437,000. The huge cost of administration came from education officials having to write individually to registered parents at feeder primary schools. In the year of the ballot – 1999/2000 – £216,283 was spent on the petition procedure's administration. The vote was allowed by the School Standards and Framework Act 1998.

Headmasters
pre 1348 Richard Chamberlain,
pre 1371 – post 1380 Master Thomas,
 in 1421 – John Chambre 
pre 1545 – post 1477 Henry Singleton,
1545 – 1553 Edmund Brown
1571 John Nettleton
1608 Christopher Lyndall
1622 John Ashmore
1623–1650 Richard Palmes
1650–1661 Roger Holmes
1661–1676 Charles Oxley
1676–1681 George Loup
1681–1685 Ralph Cottingham
1685–1704 Thomas Thomson
1704–1721 Thomas Lloyd
1721–1730 John Barber
1731–1737 Thomas Stevens
1737 William Scott
1738 James Topham
1738–1771 George Hyde
1772–1798 Solomon Robinson
1798–1809 Isaac Cook
1809–1811 William Ewbank
1812–1851 William Plues
1851–1872 J. F. MacMichael
1872–1879 F. A. Hooper
1879–1890 A. B. Haslam
1890–1895 W. Yorke Fausset
1895–1919 C. C. S. Bland
1919–1935 James Dyson
1935–1957 W. J. Strachan
1957–1974 Robert Atkinson
1974–1991 Brian Stanley
1992–2004 Alan Jones
2004–2017 Martin Pearman
2017–present Jonathan Webb

Former teachers
 Thomas Ashworth, headteacher of Ermysted's Grammar School in Skipton from 1998–2008 (head of maths from 1983–8)

Old Riponians

Former pupils are known as Old Riponians. The contact details for the alumni association are available on the school's website.

Notable old Riponians include:
 William Hague, former Secretary of State for Foreign and Commonwealth Affairs
 Katharine Viner, editor-in-chief  of The Guardian from summer 2015
 Richard Hammond, television presenter – Top Gear/Total Wipeout/Richard Hammond's Blast Lab/The Grand Tour
 David Curry, former Member of Parliament for Skipton & Ripon (head boy in 1962) 
 Bruce Oldfield, fashion designer
 Matthew Hutton (Archbishop of Canterbury)
 David George Kendall, statistician, Professor of Mathematical Statistics from 1962–85 at the University of Cambridge
 Peter Squires, British Lion & England Rugby Union International/Yorkshire County Cricketer
 Peter Toyne, CBE, 1st Vice-Chancellor from 1992–2000 of Liverpool John Moores University, and Rector from 1986–92 of Liverpool Polytechnic
 Paul Hullah, writer
 Jack Laugher, British Olympic Diver (Gold Medallist at Rio 2016) & Travian expert
 Peter Marshall, Ambassador to Algeria from 1995–6
 Maurice Edwards, Chaplain-in-Chief of the RAF from 1940–4 
 Francis Pigou, Dean of Bristol from 1891 to 1916
 Beilby Porteus, Georgian Bishop of Chester and London
 William Stubbs, the Victorian Bishop of Oxford from 1889–1901, and Regius Professor of Modern History (Oxford) from 1866–84

References

Further reading
 Philip W. Rogers, A History of Ripon Grammar School (Ripon: Wakeman Press, 1954)

External links
 Ripon Grammar School's website
 Ripon Grammar School's Youtube channel
 Old Riponians' website
 EduBase

Grammar schools in North Yorkshire
Boarding schools in North Yorkshire
1555 establishments in England
Educational institutions established in the 1550s
Ripon
Community schools in North Yorkshire
State funded boarding schools in England